Justine Benin, (born 12 March 1975) is a French employment counsellor and politician who briefly served as Secretary of State for the Sea in the government of Prime Minister Élisabeth Borne in 2022. She previously was a deputy in the 15th legislature of the French Fifth Republic for the 2nd constituency of Guadeloupe as part of the Miscellaneous left, affiliated with the Democratic Movement (MoDem).

Political career
Born in Les Abymes, Guadeloupe, Benin made her debut in politics at the municipal elections of 2008 by being elected to the Le Moule council on the list of Gabrielle Louis-Carabin, then a member of UMP.
At the 2010 regional elections, she was elected on the list of the socialist winner Victorin Lurel.

The following year, during the cantonal elections she was elected general councillor in the canton of Moule-2, eliminating from the first round the outgoing socialist Christian Couchy. She was re-elected at the 2015 departmental election, after the merger of the townships of the municipality in the new canton of Moule.

On 17 June 2017, Benin was elected as a left-wing deputy for Guadeloupe's 2nd constituency, receiving 64.26% of the votes cast in the 2nd round against the LREM candidate Diana Peran.

In May 2022, Benin was appointed Secretary of State for the Sea in the Borne government. She lost her seat in the first round of the 2022 French legislative election.

Bibliography

References

External links
 Her page on the site of the National Assembly
 Her page on the MoDem site

Deputies of the 15th National Assembly of the French Fifth Republic
1975 births
Living people
People from Les Abymes
Women members of the National Assembly (France)
Guadeloupean politicians
21st-century French women politicians
Black French politicians
Women government ministers of France
Members of the Borne government